Yeonil is a town, or eup in Nam-gu, Pohang, North Gyeongsang Province, South Korea. The township Yeonil-myeon had been upgraded to the town Yeonil-eup in 1980. Yeonil Town Office is located in Geojeong-ri.

Communities
Yeonil-eup is divided into 13 villages (ri).

References

External links
Official website 

Pohang
Towns and townships in North Gyeongsang Province